The SGB Premiership 2019 was the 85th season of the top division, called the SGB Premiership, of the British speedway championship in 2019. From the 2018 league season two teams, Leicester Lions and Somerset Rebels, dropped down to the next league down, the SGB Championship, and were replaced in the league by Ipswich Witches and Peterborough Panthers. Although no promotion or relegation exist in British speedway these changes were taken purely due to financial concerns of the teams that dropped out of the SGB Premiership. Rye House Rockets who had taken part in the previous SGB Premiership season closed down.

2019 teams

Background
The league ran between March and October 2019 and had seven teams participating. The line-up of teams changed from the previous 2018 league season with both Leicester Lions and Somerset Rebels dropping down into the SGB Championship and being replaced by two 2018 SGB Championship teams Ipswich Witches and Peterborough Panthers. Rye House Rockets who withdrew from the 2018 did not reenter the league. Poole Pirates were the defending champions after winning the title in 2018. BT Sport continued its TV coverage of the SGB Premiership in 2019.

At the Speedway AGM in November 2018, a number of changes were made to the rules and regulations for 2019. The biggest change was the introduction of fixed race nights: from now on, all Premiership meetings would be held on either a Monday or Thursday. Riders in teams must have achieved a minimum average of 3.00 to be able to race in the league. Although the team points limit remained at 42.50.

League results
Teams face each other four times: twice home and away. The first of the home and away meetings are called the 'A' fixtures, and the second are the 'B' fixtures.

A Fixtures

B Fixtures

League table
Final Table Up To And Including Wednesday 18 September

Play-offs

Home team scores are in bold
Overall aggregate scores are in red

Semi-finals

Grand final

Premiership Supporters Cup
The 2019 Knockout Cup (branded as the Premiership Supporters Cup) was the 77th edition of the Knockout Cup for tier one teams.

Northern Group

The Wolverhampton Wolves Vs Peterborough Panthers fixture was not restaged after one postponement, and one abandonment.

Northern Group Table
Final Table Up To And Including Monday 22 April

Southern Group

The Poole Pirates Vs King's Lynn Stars fixture was not restaged after it was postponed twice

Southern Group Table
Final Table Up To And Including Thursday 27 June

Grand final

SGB Premiership Shield

Leading averages
Final SGB Premiership Averages Up To And Including Wednesday 30 October

Official Speedway GB Green Sheets Averages

Riders and final averages

Belle Vue Aces

 9.23
 8.47
 6.84
 6.40
 5.65
 5.38
 5.00
 4.96
 4.77
 0.00

27 June Aarnio replaced Ricky Wells in the Belle Vue Aces team
30 July Nikolaj Busk Jakobsen 5.65 replaced the injured Tero Aarnio in the Belle Vue Aces team
23 August Jye Etheridge replaced the injured Nikolaj Busk Jakobsen in the Belle Vue Aces team

Ipswich Witches

 8.25
 7.44
 7.34
 7.05
 6.46
 6.27
 5.93
 5.62
 5.19
 3.60

7 June Edward Kennett replaced David Bellego in the Ipswich Witches team
27 August Niels-Kristian Iversen and James Sarjeant replaced Edward Kennett and Krystian Pieszczek in the Ipswich Witches team

King's Lynn Stars

 8.32
 8.28
 7.17
 6.92
 6.51
 6.47
 5.65
 5.40
 3.87
 2.53

28 May Craig Cook and Simon Lambert replaced Kasper Andersen and the injured Erik Riss in the King's Lynn Stars team 
27 June Broc Nicol and Erik Riss replaced Simon Lambert and Ty Proctor in the King's Lynn Stars team 
17 July Nicklas Porsing replaced the planned signed rider Broc Nicol due to his injuries in the King's Lynn Stars team

Peterborough Panthers

 7.22
 6.97
 6.11
 5.91
 6.13
 5.65
 5.57
 5.50
 4.83
 4.40
 4.00
 3.50

18 January Chris Harris is released from his Peterborough Panthers contract
27 March Craig Cook is released from his Peterborough Panthers contract
30 March Aaron Summers signed for Peterborough Panthers
21 May Josh Bates and Scott Nicholls replaced Ben Barker and Lasse Bjerre in the Peterborough Panthers team 
27 June Ty Proctor replaced the injured Bradley Wilson-Dean in the Peterborough Panthers team
14 August Jason Garrity replaced the injured Josh Bates in the Peterborough Panthers team
27 August Ulrich Østergaard replaced the injured Aaron Summers in the Peterborough Panthers team

Poole Pirates

 8.25
 8.14
 8.11
 8.04
 6.09
 5.37
 5.33
 4.58
 4.19

17 July Ricky Wells replaced Nikolaj Busk Jakobsen in the Poole Pirates team 
27 August Thomas H. Jonasson replaced the injured Richie Worrall in the Poole Pirates team

Swindon Robins

 9.89
 9.36
 8.32
 7.27
 7.05
 5.87
 4.30
 4.24
 4.00
 2.33
 1.33
 0.00

23 May Ellis Perks replaced James Shanes in the Swindon Robins team 
2 May Rasmus Jensen replaced Dawid Lampart in the Swindon Robins team 
5 June Zach Wajtknecht stood down from the Swindon Robins team with Stefan Nielsen replacing him
19 June David Bellego replaced the injured Tobiasz Musielak in the Swindon Robins team 
10 July Claus Vissing replaced the injured Stefan Nielsen in the Swindon Robins team 
16 July Tobiasz Musielak replaced David Bellego in the Swindon Robins team

Wolverhampton Wolves

 8.35
 8.19
 7.71
 7.50
 6.79
 6.53
 5.89
 5.64
 3.26

14 March Scott Nicholls replaced the injured Jacob Thorssell in the Wolverhampton Wolves team 
21 May Jacob Thorssell replaced Scott Nicholls in the Wolverhampton Wolves team 
29 June Ryan Douglas replaced Ashley Morris in the Wolverhampton Wolves team

See also
List of United Kingdom speedway league champions
Knockout Cup (speedway)

References

SGB Premiership
SGB Premiership
SGB Premiership 2019